John Hart Dick (19 March 1930 – September 2000) was a Scottish footballer who played for  Crittall Athletic, West Ham United, Brentford, Gravesend & Northfleet and a single appearance for Scotland.

Career
Born in Glasgow, he became a prolific goalscorer and became the first West Ham United player to play for the Scottish national team. He joined West Ham from Crittall Athletic while on national service. Between 1953 and 1962, Dick made 364 appearances for the club, mainly at inside left. He scored 176 goals for West Ham in all competitions, placing him joint third on the club's all-time top scorers list. He eventually moved to Brentford for an incoming record £17,500 transfer fee. He was later in charge of West Ham Juniors.  Dick died in September 2000.

International career
Dick made one appearance for Scotland, against England at Wembley Stadium in 1959.

Honours 
Brentford
 Football League Fourth Division: 1962–63

References

External links 
 
 

1930 births
2000 deaths
People from Govan
Footballers from Glasgow
Association football inside forwards
Scottish footballers
Scotland international footballers
Scotland B international footballers
Braintree Town F.C. players
West Ham United F.C. players
Brentford F.C. players
Ebbsfleet United F.C. players
English Football League players
Southern Football League players
West Ham United F.C. non-playing staff